Roberto Hernández Prendes (6 March 1967 – 5 July 2021) was a Cuban track and field sprinter who specialized in the 400 metres. He was born in Limonar, Matanzas. His personal best for the 400 metres is 44.14 seconds, set in Seville, Spain in May 1990.  Until September 2006, this was the fastest time by anyone not from the US. It remains the Cuban record for the event. He broke 44.5 seconds on four other occasions.

Hernandez finished fourth in the World Championship finals in 1987 and 1991. As a member of the Cuban 4 × 400 m relay squad he won a World Championship Bronze medal in 1987 and an Olympic Silver medal in 1992. As of 1 October 2014, Hernandez holds the fastest non-winning time for the 300 metres.

International competitions

1Representing the Americas

References 

 

1967 births
2021 deaths
People from Matanzas Province
Cuban male sprinters
Pan American Games medalists in athletics (track and field)
Pan American Games gold medalists for Cuba
Athletes (track and field) at the 1987 Pan American Games
Athletes (track and field) at the 1991 Pan American Games
Athletes (track and field) at the 1995 Pan American Games
Athletes (track and field) at the 1999 Pan American Games
Olympic athletes of Cuba
Olympic silver medalists for Cuba
Athletes (track and field) at the 1992 Summer Olympics
Athletes (track and field) at the 1996 Summer Olympics
Medalists at the 1992 Summer Olympics
World Athletics Championships athletes for Cuba
World Athletics Championships medalists
Olympic silver medalists in athletics (track and field)
Universiade medalists in athletics (track and field)
Goodwill Games medalists in athletics
Central American and Caribbean Games gold medalists for Cuba
Competitors at the 1990 Central American and Caribbean Games
Universiade gold medalists for Cuba
World Athletics Indoor Championships medalists
Central American and Caribbean Games medalists in athletics
Competitors at the 1990 Goodwill Games
Medalists at the 1987 Pan American Games
Medalists at the 1991 Pan American Games
20th-century Cuban people